Hito Steyerl (born 1 January 1966) is a German filmmaker, moving image artist, writer, and innovator of the essay documentary. Her principal topics of interest are media, technology, and the global circulation of images. Steyerl holds a PhD in Philosophy from the Academy of Fine Arts Vienna. She is currently a professor of New Media Art at the Berlin University of the Arts, where she co-founded the Research Center for Proxy Politics, together with Vera Tollmann and Boaz Levin.

Life and career
Steyerl was born on 1 January 1966 in Munich and attended the Japan Institute of the Moving Image. She later studied at the University of Television and Film Munich. Steyerl was deeply influenced by Harun Farocki, although she has cited her former professor, the noted film historian Helmut Färber, as having a more direct influence on her work.

In 2004 she participated in Manifesta 5, The European Biennial of Contemporary Art. She has also participated in the 2008 Shanghai Biennale and the 2010 Gwangju and Taipei biennials.  In 2007, her film Lovely Andrea was exhibited as a part of documenta 12 in Kassel, Germany. In 2013 her work was included in the Venice Biennale and the Istanbul Biennial. In 2015, her work was included in the German pavilion at the Venice Biennale. In 2019, it was featured in the Arsenale of the Venice Biennale.

Hito Steyerl’s work pushes the boundary of traditional video, often obscuring what is real beneath many layers of metaphors and satirical humor. She referred to her piece, Red Alert, as "the outer limit of video". Red Alert consists of three monitors playing a video of pure red, and was commissioned to be a static representation of Steyerl's film Lovely Andrea. The color red was chosen for its connotations to terror alerts and red-light districts, referencing the themes of military violence and pornographic exploitation present in Lovely Andrea.

Her work concerns topics of militarization, surveillance migration, the role of media in globalization, and the dissemination of images and the culture surrounding it. Steyerl has pushed both the role and the label of fine artist, which is demonstrated through her tendencies and interests in engaging the presentational context of art. Her work is developed from research, interviews, and the collection of found images, culminating in pedagogically-oriented work in the realm of forensic documentaries and dream-like montages.

In 2017, Steyerl was listed as the number one most influential person in the contemporary art world.

In recent years, Steyerl's work has expanded to confront the status of images in an increasingly digital world, institutions (including museums), networks, and labor. Her work has addressed the topic of corporate sponsorship by engaging with institutions, including Drill in 2019 at the Park Avenue Armory in New York, for which Steyerl revealed histories connecting the building hosting the exhibition with the founding of the National Rifle Association. On the topic of private funding, Steyerl has expressed: 'Ultimately, it will be important to move beyond protests against individuals and try to frame the problems more generally in terms of a new charter for the art world: a set of principles that include different aspects, like pay, sponsorship, governance, transparency standards, representation, sustainability, and so on, like a new deal for museums.' Steyerl employs increasingly complex approaches to pixelation within the digital sphere, editing, digital graphics, and video installation architecture.

Solo exhibitions

Steyerl has had numerous solo exhibitions, including:

 Hito Steyerl, Chisenhale Gallery, London (2010) 
 Hito Steyerl, E-flux, New York (2012)
 Hito Steyerl, Art Institute of Chicago, (2012)
 Hito Steyerl, Van Abbemuseum, Eindhoven, Netherlands (2014)
 Hito Steyerl, Institute of Contemporary Arts, London (2014)
 En defensa de la imagen pobre ("In defense of the poor image") and Arte, control y dominación. 3 películas de Hito Steyerl ("Art, control and domination. 3 films of Hito Steyerl"), MUNTREF as part of the Bienal de la Imagen en Movimiento (BIM) (2014)
 Hito Steyerl, How Not To Be Seen: A Fucking Didactic Educational Installation, Andrew Kreps Gallery, New York (2014)
 Hito Steyerl, Artists Space, New York (2015)
 Hito Steyerl, Left To Our Own Devices, KOW, Berlin (2015)
 Hito Steyerl, Duty-Free Art , Museo Nacional Centro de Arte Reina Sofía, Madrid (2015)
 Hito Steyerl, Factory of the Sun, Museum of Contemporary Art, Los Angeles (2016)
 Hito Steyerl, Factory of the Sun, Hartware MedienKunstVerein in the Dortmunder U, Dortmund, Germany (2016)
Hito Steyerl, The City of Broken Windows, Museo d'Arte Contemporanea Castello di Rivoli, Turin (2018) 
 Hito Steyerl, Power Plants, Serpentine Galleries, London (2019)
 Hito Steyerl, This is the Future, Art Gallery of Ontario, Toronto, Canada (2020)
 Hito Steyerl, I Will Survive, Stedelijk Museum, Amsterdam, Netherlands (2022)

Notable works 
 Lovely Andrea (2007)
 Red Alert (2007)
 How to Not Be Seen: A Fucking Didactic Educational .MOV File (2013)
 Is the Museum a Battlefield? (2013) 
 Liquidity Inc. (2014)
 Factory of the Sun (2015)

 Drill (2019)

Videos

How Not To Be Seen: A Fucking Didactic Educational .MOV File 
In 2013 Steyerl released her video How Not to Be Seen, presenting five lessons in invisibility. These lessons include how to 1. Make something invisible for a camera, 2. Be invisible in plain sight, 3. Become invisible by becoming a picture, 4. Be invisible by disappearing, and 5. Become invisible by merging into a world made of pictures. Many of these methods may seem impossible. How Not to Be Seen is a satirical take on instructional films. Much of the video also deals with surveillance and digital imagery: for example, figures in all black dance around as "pixels," and aerial photography features frequently. Thus, How Not to be Seen becomes a tutorial for invisibility in an age of intense hypersurveillance.

Liquidity, Inc. 
Liquidity, Inc., (from 2014) consists of a video and a seating/backdrop installation. The video includes interviews with Jason Wood, a financial-advisor-turned-MMA-fighter, mesmerizing clips of ocean waves, and mock-weather reports from characters in balaclavas. As these visuals swirl around, a metaphor forms between water and images/money/trend in the digital age.

Factory of the Sun 
Factory of the Sun, like Liquidity, Inc. deals with finance. In this video, which debuted at the 2015 Venice Biennial, clip art people swarm and create "artificial sunshine" for a bank. The video utilizes light, sunshine, and warmth as motifs as it explores surveillance and mega-finance.

Awards
In 2010 Steyerl was awarded with the NEW:VISION Award at the Copenhagen International Documentary Festival for her film In Free Fall. In 2015 Steyerl won the inaugural EYE Prize, a collaboration between EYE Film Institute Netherlands and the Paddy & Joan Leigh Fermor Arts Fund. The aim of the award is to support and promote an artist or filmmaker who have made outstanding contributions to their field.

Select writings
Steyerl is a frequent contributor to online art journals such as E-flux. She has also written:

 2007. Steyerl, Hito. "Documentary Uncertainty," in A Prior Magazine Issue #15.
 2009. Steyerl, Hito. "The Institution of Critique," in Art and Contemporary Critical Practice: Reinventing Institutional Critique. Mayflybooks/Ephemera. Edited by Gerald Raunig and Gene Ray 
 2009. Steyerl, Hito. "In Defense of the Poor Image," in E-flux Issue #10.
 2010. Steyerl, Hito. "A Thing Like You and Me," in E-flux Issue #15. 
 2012. Steyerl, Hito, and Berardi, Franco. The Wretched of the Screen. Sternberg Press. .
 2014. Steyerl, Hito. Hito Steyerl: Too Much World. Sternberg Press. Edited by Nick Aikens. 
 2016. Steyerl, Hito. Jenseits der Repräsentation / Beyond Representation: Essays 1999–2009. Walther König. Edited by Marius Babias, contributions by Thomas Elsässer and Simon Sheik. 
 2016. Steyerl, Hito. "If You Don’t Have Bread, Eat Art!: Contemporary Art and Derivative Fascisms," in E-flux Issue #76.
 2017. Steyerl, Hito. Duty Free Art: Art in the Age of Planetary Civil War. Verso.

Bibliography
 Canadian Art. "Hito Steyerl: A Primer." Canadian Art, August 19, 2015.
 Demos, TJ. "Traveling Images: Hito Steyerl." Artforum (Summer 2008): 408–413.
 Gerhardt, Christina. Christina Gerhardt, "Transnational Germany: Hito Steyerl's Die leere Mitte and 200 Years of Border Crossings." Women in German Yearbook 22 (2007): 205–223.
 Ryan, Bartholomew. 9 Artists. Walker Art Center, 2013.
 Gerhardt, Christina and Jaimey Hamilton Faris. "Liquidity Incorporated: Economics Tides and Fluid Data in Hito Steyerl's Liquidity, Inc."  Make Waves: Water in Contemporary Literature and Film.  Ed. Paula A. Farca. University of Nevada Press, 2019. 12–21.

See also
 Post-Internet art

References

External links 
 Hito Stereyl, MoMA Learning
 Hito Steyerl | Politics of Post-Representation, In conversation with Marvin Jordan, DIS Magazine
Andrew Kreps Gallery at Ocula
 MoMA Learning
 Artists Space
 'Why Games? Can an Art Professional Think?'. Video of the complete conference of Hito Steyerl at Fundació Antoni Tàpies museum, Barcelona.

Living people
German documentary filmmakers
German essayists
Academic staff of the Berlin University of the Arts
1966 births
German women artists
German contemporary artists
Women documentary filmmakers